Genuit Group, formerly Polypipe, is a manufacturer of plastic piping systems, for use in the residential, commercial, civils and infrastructure sectors. The piping systems are used for a variety of applications including drainage, plumbing, water supply, water management, cable management, heating and ventilation. The company is listed on the London Stock Exchange and is a constituent of the FTSE 250 Index.

History
The company was established as Polypipe by Kevin McDonald (a former plumber) and Geoff Harrison in 1980. In October 1995 the company bought Sud Ouest Plastiques (of France) for £2.1m, in January 1997 it bought TDI for £3.1m and in November 1997 it bought Gabo Systemtechnik for £6m. Then in July 1998 the company bought Domus Ducting (renamed Polypipe Ventilation) for £4.7m and in January 1999 it bought Pagette Sanitar Produktions (of Germany) for £9m.

In March 1999 the company was bought by IMI for £337m; Kevin MacDonald made £56m from this deal and Geoffrey Harrison made £12.5m. IMI sold Polypipe to Castle Harlan (of the United States), a private equity company, for £293m in September 2005. In May 2007 it bought Terrain, a PVC piping business in Aylesford in Kent. Then in August 2007, a management buyout took control of the company from the private equity company, in a deal funded by Bank of Scotland Integrated Finance. In February 2010 the company bought Silavent, a ventilation manufacturer.

In April 2014, Polypipe was the subject of an initial public offering on the London Stock Exchange. Then in November 2014, Polypipe acquired the Ferrob Ventilation business. In February 2015, Polypipe acquired Surestop, a business producing an alternative product to the brass stopcock, and in August 2015 Polypipe acquired Nuaire, a ventilation systems manufacturer.

It was announced in May 2017 that Martin Payne will succeed David Hall as the CEO following his retirement.

The company changed its name from Polypipe to Genuit Group in March 2021.

Operations
The head office is in Edlington, Doncaster, UK. Its businesses are located as follows:

 Polypipe Building Products - based in Doncaster and Glasgow
 Polypipe Civils and Green Urbanisation - based in Loughborough and Horncastle
 Polypipe Building Services - based in Aylesford, Kent
 Polypipe Ventilation - based in Caerphilly
 Robimatic - based in Kirk Sandall
 Polypipe Italy – based in Monleone di Cicagna, Genova, Italy
 Alderburgh – based in Rochdale
 Polypipe Middle East - based in Dubai, United Arab Emirates, with offices also in Doha, Qatar
 Surestop - based in Birmingham
 Manthorpe Building Products - based in Ripley, Derbyshire

See also
 Water Regulations Advisory Scheme
 British Board of Agrément

References

External links
 Official site

Plastics companies of the United Kingdom
Plumbing materials companies
Manufacturing companies of the United Kingdom
Companies based in Doncaster
Manufacturing companies established in 1980
Companies listed on the London Stock Exchange
Pipe manufacture